Selenicereus costaricensis, synonym Hylocereus costaricensis, known as the Costa Rican pitahaya or Costa Rica nightblooming cactus, is a cactus species native to Central America and north-eastern South America.  The species is grown commercially for its fruit, called pitaya or pitahaya, but is also an impressive ornamental vine with huge flowers. The species may not be distinct from Selenicereus monacanthus.

Description

Stem scandent, 1-3 (-10) cm wide, usually very thick; ribs 3 (-4), margins straight to shallowly scallop-lobed; internodes 2-3.5 x 0.1-0.2 cm; often folded, areoles on prominences, bearing dense, short wool and (1-) 3-6 (-9) short, dark spines 2–4 mm, hairs 2, often bristle-like, soon dropping; epidermis grayish green, +- glaucous in fresh material.
Flowers funnel-shaped, 22–30 cm long, strongly perfumed, young buds globular; cylindric-ovoid, ca 4 cm long, bracteoles narrow, foliaceous, numerous, imbricate, 1–2 cm long; receptacle stout, 10–15 cm, throat obconic, 6 cm in wide at the orifice, bracteoles foliaceous, persistent, particularly imbricating towards the base, green with purple margins; tepals 11–15 cm, the outer greenish yellow, the inner white; stigma lobes ca. 12, not forked; ovary covered with large, broadly to narrowly triangular, overlapping bracteoles, 0.5–3 cm.  
Fruit broadly ovate to globose, bright magenta, pupla purple; seeds pear-shaped, black, ca 10mm.

Taxonomy
Both the identity and the nomenclature of the species have been problematic. The name Cereus trigonus var. costaricensis was first published by Frédéric Weber in 1902. The epithet costaricensis refers to Costa Rica, where it is native. The plant Weber described had a triangular stem like Cereus trigonus, but was "distinguished by its more glaucous stem and especially by its fruit, just as big but more spherical, less scaly, and filled with a crimson pulp of a very delicate taste." It was said to be highly sought after in Costa Rica for its fruit, known as pitahaya. Weber mentioned a photograph of the plant, but as of 2017 this had not been located, so the name lacked a type. In 1909, Britton and Rose transferred the plant to the genus Hylocereus and raised it to a full species as Hylocereus costaricensis.

A molecular phylogenetic study in 2017 confirmed earlier research showing that the genus Hylocereus was nested within Selenicereus, so all the species of Hylocereus were transferred to Selenicereus, with this species becoming Selenicereus costaricensis. However, in the absence of a type, the names remained problematic. In 2021, a lectotype was designated, and the name was accepted by the International Plant Names Index and Plants of the World Online.

The species has been described as "poorly understood". The name Hylocereus costaricensis has been treated as synonymous with Hylocereus polyrhizus; however, H. polyrhizus is regarded by other sources as a synonym of Selenicereus monacanthus. The relationship between S. costaricensis and S. monacanthus, and in particular whether they are separate species, requires further study.

Distribution and habitat
The species is native from Nicaragua to northern Peru, although its natural range is hard to determine because it has been cultivated so widely.

Cultivation

An easily cultivated, fast growing epiphyte or xerophyte.  Needs a compost containing plenty of humus and sufficient moisture in summer.  It should not be kept under 10 °C (50 °F) in winter. Can be grown in semi-shade or full sun.  Extra light in the early spring will stimulate budding. Flowers in summer or autumn.

See also
Pitaya
List of culinary fruits

References

External links

costaricensis
Cacti of North America
Cacti of South America
Flora of Central America
Flora of western South America
Neotropical realm flora
Tropical fruit
Desert fruits
Crops originating from the Americas
Garden plants of Central America
Garden plants of South America
Drought-tolerant plants
Vines
Night-blooming plants
Epiphytes
House plants